Eran Zahavi (or Zehavi,  ; born 25 July 1987) is an Israeli professional footballer who plays as a forward for Israeli Premier League club Maccabi Tel Aviv.

Zahavi was named Israeli Footballer of the Year twice (2013–14 and 2014–15), and finished as the top goalscorer of the Israeli Premier League for three consecutive seasons, in 2013–14 (29 goals), 2014–15 (27 goals) and 2015–16 (35 goals, all-time league record). In December 2014, Zahavi broke the Israeli Premier League record for scoring in consecutive appearances after he scored for the 18th game in a row. In 2016, he broke the Israeli league six-decade-old season scoring record, beating the 1954–55 record. He was named the 2017 Chinese Super League MVP, and broke the league's single-season scoring record in 2019.

Zahavi was Israel's senior international between 2010 and 2021, making 70 appearances. He was also a national team captain and is the all-time top scorer for Israel with 33 goals.

Early life
Zahavi was born and raised in Rishon LeZion, Israel, to Jewish parents. He has served in the Israel Defense Forces to complete his mandatory military service.

He also holds a French passport, on account of his French-born father.

Club career

Zahavi started his youth career with Hapoel Tel Aviv at the age of 6. At the age of 16 he went to Ironi Rishon LeZion, in his hometown. Two years later, in 2005, he returned to Hapoel.

Hapoel Tel Aviv
A Hapoel Tel Aviv youth product, Zahavi was promoted to its senior team in 2006. With Hapoel, he won the 2009–10 Israel State Cup and the 2009–10 Israeli Premier League title after a dramatic match against the fierce rivals Beitar Jerusalem in the last round of the season, in which he scored the winning goal in the 92nd minute. Zahavi was reported to have garnered interest from clubs in Belgium during the 2009–10 season.

In the 2010–11 season Zahavi became the top assist provider of the Israeli Premier League, providing 13 assists during the season.

Palermo
Zahavi signed a five-year deal with the Italian Serie A club, Palermo, before the beginning of the 2011–12 Serie A season. He capped two seasons with 23 appearances in the top league in Italy, scoring two goals versus Bologna and Cagliari.

Maccabi Tel Aviv
In December 2012, towards the winter transfers window opening, Zahavi showed signs of returning to Israel. Following an agreement made by Palermo and Maccabi Tel Aviv, his former club Hapoel Tel Aviv was given seven days to make a bid on him due to a first-option clause in his contract, but it was not exploited. On 21 January 2013, after over a month of speculation in the media, Maccabi Tel Aviv announced his arrival, signing him on a three-and-a-half year contract for €250,000.

At the Tel Aviv derby on 3 November 2014, Zahavi scored a penalty to equalise the score at 1–1 in the first half but was then attacked by a pitch invader. On retaliating, he was sent off, prompting more pitch invasions which led to the match being abandoned.

In the beginning of the 2015–16 season, Zahavi was appointed as Maccabi's new captain after former captain Sheran Yeini signed at Dutch football club Vitesse. On 5 August 2015, Zahavi scored two goals against Czech team Viktoria Plzeň in a 2–0 away victory in the second leg of the third qualifying round after Maccabi lost at home 2–1. On 19 August 2015, Zahavi scored a brace, including a 96th-minute equaliser, in a 2–2 draw against Swiss side Basel at St. Jakob-Park in the first leg of the Champions League playoffs. On 25 August, during the second leg at Bloomfield, he scored a 24th-minute equaliser as the match ended 1–1, a result that sent Maccabi to the Champions League group stage due to the away goals rule. Zahavi finished the Champions League qualifying phase and play-off round as the top goalscorer with 7 goals in 5 games. During the season Zahavi scored 35 league goals, in 36 league games, and set a new Israeli record for league goals in single season. The previous record was set by the striker Nissim Elmaliach, who scored 30 goals in 26 league games during the 1954–55 season.

Guangzhou R&F
On 29 June 2016, Zahavi joined Guangzhou R&F of the Chinese Super League, making him the second Israeli footballer in China after Liron Zarko. The transfer deal paid Zahavi a reported $12.5 million over two-and-a-half years.
On 2 July, Zahavi made his debut coming on from the bench at the 60th minute playing against Shijiazhuang Ever Bright with the score a 1–1 draw. 15 minutes later he scored his first goal, and later on he added an assist to lead his team to a 4–2 victory.

On 13 July, Zahavi scored a hat-trick in 19 minutes in the Chinese FA Cup match against Hebei China Fortune, coming on from the bench in the second half and helping R&F to a 3–0 win. On 18 October, during a league match against Hangzhou Greentown, Zahavi netted his second hat-trick in an R&F jersey, propelling them to a 5–2 victory. He found the net in the 33rd, 55th, and 67th minutes of the match. Those goals gave him 16 goals in as many games for R&F, across all competitions. These scoring exploits quickly earned him the nickname "the King of Yuexiushan".

Zahavi finished his first half season for Guangzhou R&F with six goals in four Chinese FA Cup games, and 11 league goals in 15 appearances. In December 2016, according to media reports, Chinese club Shandong Luneng Taishan F.C. offered $20 million for Zahavi, the highest transfer fee ever offered for an Israeli footballer. On 24 January 2017, Zahavi signed a renewed contract with Guangzhou R&F until the end of the 2020 season, for an estimated $7 million per season. On 23 July, in the league match against Yanbian Funde, he scored four goals for Guangzhou in a 6–2 victory. Zahavi finished the 2017 season with 27 league goals (one short of the league record) to win the CSL Golden Boot Award. He was also named the Most Valuable Player in the Chinese Super League, and selected in the CSL team of the year.

After Shanghai Greenland Shenhua failed to sign Zahavi in September 2017 for a transfer fee of $25 million, Zahavi renewed his contract with Guangzhou R&F in February 2018 for an estimated $10 million per season on a three-year contract. On 2 March, during round 1 of the 2018 CSL season, Zahavi scored a hat-trick and assisted one goal in the 5–4 away win against reigning champions Guangzhou Evergrande Taobao.

In November 2019, Zahavi broke the CSL single-season scoring record after scoring his 29th goal of the season, surpassing the previous record set by Elkeson in 2014.

PSV Eindhoven
On 20 September 2020, Zahavi signed a two-year deal with Eredivisie side PSV Eindhoven. He made his debut for the Dutch side on 1 October 2020 in UEFA Europa League play-offs against Norwegian side Rosenborg, contributing to the 2–0 away win with a goal and an assist.

On 21 July 2021, Zahavi scored a hat-trick and made an assist in a 5–1 win against Galatasaray, in the first leg of the UEFA Champions League second qualifying round match.

In March 2022, Zahavi was named by the UEFA Europa Conference League as its Player of the Week, thanks to his two-goal display against Copenhagen in the round of 16 second leg, earning his side a 4–0 win. In the same month, he was also named as Eredivisie Player of the Month after scoring in each of the three games he played in March. Zahavi scored his eighth European goal of the season in the Conference League quarter-finals against Leicester City, and thus equalised the PSV record shared by Willy van der Kuijlen and Gerrie Deijkers, who both scored eight European goals for the club in the 1970s.

Zahavi left the club after the 2021–22 season after his contract was not renewed.

Return to Maccabi Tel Aviv
On 26 June 2022, Zahavi returned to Maccabi Tel Aviv on a two-year contract, having previously played for the Israeli Premier League side between 2013 and 2016.

International career

Zahavi made his senior debut for Israel on 2 September 2010 against Malta in UEFA Euro 2012 qualifiers. He scored his first goal for the national team on 10 September 2013 against Russia in the 2014 FIFA World Cup qualifiers.

On 24 March 2019, he scored a hat-trick against Austria in a 4–2 home win, during the UEFA Euro 2020 qualifiers.

On 7 June 2019, Zahavi scored a back-to-back hat-trick against Latvia in a 3–0 away win, during the UEFA Euro 2020 qualifiers. Zahavi scored a total of eleven goals during the 2020 Euro qualifiers, and was thus the second best overall goalscorer (along with Cristiano Ronaldo) across all qualifying groups, and only a goal behind Harry Kane.

On 14 October 2020, during a 2020–21 UEFA Nations League B match against Slovakia, Zahavi scored three goals in the span of 20 minutes to bring Israel from 0–2 behind to a 3–2 win. With five goals, Zahavi was the second best goalscorer across all divisions of the 2020–21 UEFA Nations League (along with League A's Romelu Lukaku), and only a goal behind League B's Erling Haaland.

On 1 September 2021, Zahavi scored his fourth international hat-trick in an away match of the 2022 FIFA World Cup qualifiers, earning Israel a 4–0 win against Faroe Islands. Three days later, he scored two goals in the World Cup qualifying match against Austria, that ended in a 5–2 home win for Israel. Even though he missed the last two matches due to injury, Zahavi managed to score a total of eight goals during the qualifiers, and was thus one of the top goalscorers across all qualifying rounds.

On 15 September 2022, Zahavi announced his retirement from the national team due to hotel room dispute during international duty.

Personal life 
On 9 May 2021, ahead of the Eredivisie match between his club PSV Eindhoven and Willem II, two armed robbers broke into Zahavi's house in Amsterdam, tying up his wife Shay ( Levy) and three children. On 12 December 2021, their house was once again broken in when Zahavi and his family were on vacation abroad.

Career statistics

Club

International

Scores and results list Israel's goal tally first, score column indicates score after each Zahavi goal.

Honours
Hapoel Tel Aviv
Israeli Premier League: 2009–10
Israel State Cup: 2009–10, 2010–11

Maccabi Tel Aviv
Israeli Premier League: 2012–13, 2013–14, 2014–15
Israel State Cup: 2014–15
Israeli Toto Cup: 2014–15

PSV Eindhoven
KNVB Cup: 2021–22
Johan Cruyff Shield: 2021

Individual
Israeli Premier League Most Assists: 2010–11
Israeli Footballer of the Year: 2013–14, 2014–15
Israeli Premier League Top goalscorer: 2013–14, 2014–15, 2015–16
Chinese Super League Player of the Year: 2017
Chinese Super League Top goalscorer: 2017, 2019
Chinese Super League Team of the Year: 2017, 2019
Eredivisie Player of the Month: March 2022

See also
List of top international men's football goal scorers by country
List of Chinese Super League hat-tricks
List of Jewish footballers
List of Jews in sports

References

External links

 
 
 
 

1987 births
Living people
Israeli people of French-Jewish descent
People with acquired French citizenship
Israeli Jews
French Jews
Jewish footballers
Israeli footballers
Israel under-21 international footballers
Israel international footballers
Association football midfielders
Association football forwards
Liga Leumit players
Israeli Premier League players
Serie A players
Chinese Super League players
Eredivisie players
Hapoel Tel Aviv F.C. players
Hapoel Rishon LeZion F.C. players
Hapoel Nir Ramat HaSharon F.C. players
Palermo F.C. players
Maccabi Tel Aviv F.C. players
Guangzhou City F.C. players
PSV Eindhoven players
Footballers from Rishon LeZion
Israeli expatriate footballers
Expatriate footballers in Italy
Expatriate footballers in China
Expatriate footballers in the Netherlands
Israeli expatriate sportspeople in Italy
Israeli expatriate sportspeople in China
Israeli expatriate sportspeople in the Netherlands
Israeli Footballer of the Year recipients